Thallium barium calcium copper oxide, or TBCCO (pronounced "tibco"), is a family of high-temperature superconductors having the generalized chemical formula TlmBa2Can−1CunO2n+m+2.

Tl2Ba2Ca2Cu3O10 (TBCCO-2223) was discovered in Prof. Allen M. Hermann's laboratory in the physics department of the University of Arkansas in October 1987 by the post-doctoral researcher Zhengzhi Sheng and Prof. Hermann. The bulk superconductivity in this material was confirmed by observations of magnetic flux expulsion and flux trapping signals (under zero field cooled and field cooled conditions) with a SQUID magnetometer in the superconductor laboratory of Timir Datta in the University of South Carolina. Allen Hermann announced his discovery and the critical temperature of 127 K, in Houston, Texas at the World Congress on Superconductivity organized by Paul Chu in February 1988.

The first series of the Tl-based superconductor containing one Tl–O layer has the general formula TlBa2Can-1CunO2n+3, whereas the second series containing two Tl–O layers has a formula of Tl2Ba2Can-1CunO2n+4 with n =1, 2 and 3. In the structure of Tl2Ba2CuO6 (Tl-2201), there is one CuO2 layer with the stacking sequence (Tl–O) (Tl–O) (Ba–O) (Cu–O) (Ba–O) (Tl–O) (Tl–O). In Tl2Ba2CaCu2O8 (Tl-2212), there are two Cu–O layers with a Ca layer in between. Similar to the Tl2Ba2CuO6 structure, Tl–O layers are present outside the Ba–O layers. In Tl2Ba2Ca2Cu3O10 (Tl-2223), there are three CuO2 layers enclosing Ca layers between each of these. In Tl-based superconductors, Tc is found to increase with the increase in CuO2 layers. However, the value of Tc decreases after four CuO2 layers in TlBa2Can-1CunO2n+3, and in the Tl2Ba2Can-1CunO2n+4 compound, it decreases after three CuO2 layers.

See also 
 Cuprate superconductors
 Bismuth strontium calcium copper oxide
 Yttrium barium copper oxide
 Lanthanum barium copper oxide

References

Copper Oxide Superconductors:, by Charles P. Poole, Timir Datta, Horacio A. Farach, John Wiley & Sons, 1988, 
Superconductivity: Its historical Roots and Development from Mercury to the Ceramic Oxides, by Per Fridtjof Dahl, AIP, New York, 1st ed. 1992,

External links 
Thallium-based high-temperature superconductors

High-temperature superconductors
Thallium compounds
Barium compounds
Calcium compounds
Copper(II) compounds
Oxides